The Australia national cricket team toured the Caribbean between March and May of 1995 and played a four-match Test series against the West Indies cricket team, winning the series 2–1 with one match drawn. Australia's victory was historic, with it being the first time the West Indies had lost a Test series and the No. 1 ranking in 15 years. The Australians also played a five match series of limited overs international matches against West Indies and three additional first-class matches.

ODI series summary

West Indies won the series 4–1.

1st ODI

2nd ODI

3rd ODI

4th ODI

5th ODI

Test series summary

1st Test

2nd Test

3rd Test

4th Test

References

1995 in Australian cricket
West Indian cricket seasons from 1970–71 to 1999–2000
1994-95
International cricket competitions from 1994–95 to 1997
1995 in West Indian cricket